The J. T. & Margaret Talkington College of Visual & Performing Arts is a college at Texas Tech University in Lubbock, Texas. Prior to 2002, the college's departments existed within the College of Arts & Sciences. In 2016, the college was renamed to honor the nearly $70 million in donations to the university by the J.T. and Margaret Talkington Foundation.

Academic programs in the Talkington College are accredited by the National Association of Schools of Art and Design, the National Association of Schools of Music, and the National Association of Schools of Theatre. Additionally, Talkington College's teacher education programs are accredited by the Southern Association of Colleges and Schools and the National Council for the Accreditation of Teacher Education

Academic departments 
 School of Art
 School of Music
 School of Theatre and Dance

Notable people

Former alumni

Faculty

References

External links
 

Educational institutions established in 2004
Visual and Performing Arts
Design schools in the United States
2004 establishments in Texas